Roger Schneider (22 May 1983 – 17 January 2020) was a Swiss long track speed skater who participated in international competitions.

Personal records

Career highlights

European Allround Championships
2008 – Kolomna,  23
National Championships
2006 – Davos,  3rd at small allround
2009 - Inzell,  1st at big allround

References

External links
Schneider at Jakub Majerski's Speedskating Database
Schneider at SkateResults.com
Photos of Roger Schneider

1983 births
2020 deaths
Swiss male speed skaters
Speed skaters at the 2010 Winter Olympics
Olympic speed skaters of Switzerland
Inline speed skaters
Sportspeople from Zürich
21st-century Swiss people